Sølve Grotmol (29 October 1939 – 30 January 2010) was a Norwegian television personality.

He grew up in Bryne. In the 1960s he was hired by the Norwegian Broadcasting Corporation, working as a news presenter as well as commenting on sports events.

Grotmol died at Mallorca in January 2010.

References

1939 births
2010 deaths
Norwegian television presenters
Norwegian women television presenters
NRK people
People from Bryne